Tricalamus is a genus of crevice weavers that was first described by J. F. Wang in 1987.

Species
 it contains 16 species:
Tricalamus albidulus Wang, 1987 – China
Tricalamus biyun Zhang, Chen & Zhu, 2009 – China
Tricalamus gansuensis Wang & Wang, 1992 – China
Tricalamus jiangxiensis Li, 1994 – China
Tricalamus lindbergi (Roewer, 1962) – Afghanistan
Tricalamus linzhiensis Hu, 2001 – China
Tricalamus longimaculatus Wang, 1987 – China
Tricalamus longiventris (Yaginuma, 1967) – Japan
Tricalamus menglaensis Wang, 1987 – China
Tricalamus meniscatus Wang, 1987 – China
Tricalamus papilionaceus Wang, 1987 – China
Tricalamus papillatus Wang, 1987 – China
Tricalamus tarimuensis (Hu & Wu, 1989) – China
Tricalamus tetragonius Wang, 1987 (type) – China
Tricalamus xianensis Wang & Wang, 1992 – China
Tricalamus xizanensis (Hu, Hu & Li, 1987) – China

References

Araneomorphae genera
Filistatidae
Spiders of Asia